The following is a list of Western Michigan Broncos men's basketball head coaches. The Broncos have had 14 coaches in their 107-season history. The team is currently coached by Clayton Bates.

Through 2019–20 season

References

Western Michigan

Western Michigan Broncos basketball, men's, coaches